Evolver may refer to:

Music
 Evolver (311 album), a 2003 album
 Evolver (The Choirboys album), a 2004 album
 Evolver (Godhead album), a 2003 album
 Evolver (The Grid album), a 1994 album
 Evolver (John Legend album), a 2008 album by R&B/soul singer John Legend
 Evolver (The Mammals album), a 2002 album

Other uses
 Evolver (software), a genetic algorithm optimization solver program
 Evolver (film), a 1995 horror/science fiction B-movie
 Evolver (synthesizer), an analog-digital hybrid synthesizer designed by Dave Smith
 Evolver (website), a web site for design, manage, and transport of 3D digital avatars